Nikaea is a genus of tiger moths in the family Erebidae.

Species
The genus consists of two species.
Nikaea longipennis (Walker, 1855)
 Found in Kumaon, Nepal, Sikkim, Assam, China (Sichuan, Yunnan, Shaanxi, Hubei, Jiangxi, Zhejiang, Fujian).
Nikaea matsumurai Kishida, 1983
 Found in Taiwan and Ryukyu in Japan.

References

Callimorphina
Moth genera